Süleyman Sabri Pasha (1873 in Monastir (Bitola) – November 3, 1941 in Istanbul) was an officer of the Ottoman Army and the general of the Turkish Army.

Works
Van Tarihi ve Kürt Türkleri Hakkında İnceleme

Medals and decorations
Order of the Medjidie 5th class
Medal of the Battle against Greece
Medal of Liyaqat
Gallipoli Star (Ottoman Empire)
Austria Hungary Order of Franz Joseph 3rd class
Medal of Independence with Red Ribbon

See also
List of high-ranking commanders of the Turkish War of Independence

Sources

1873 births
People from Bitola
Ottoman Military Academy alumni
Ottoman Army officers
Ottoman military personnel of the Greco-Turkish War (1897)
Ottoman military personnel of the Italo-Turkish War
Ottoman military personnel of the Balkan Wars
Ottoman military personnel of World War I
Turkish military personnel of the Turkish War of Independence
Turkish Army generals
Turkish military personnel of the Greco-Turkish War (1919–1922)
Macedonian Turks
Recipients of the Order of the Medjidie
Recipients of the Liakat Medal
Recipients of the Order of Franz Joseph
Recipients of the Medal of Independence with Red Ribbon (Turkey)
Year of death missing